The Bernard H.52 was a French floatplane fighter aircraft of the 1930s.  It was a single engine, single-seat monoplane built in the hope of being selected by the French Navy.  Two prototypes were built, but no production followed.

Design and development

In late 1932, the Société des Avions Bernard proposed to build a floatplane fighter to meet the requirements of the French Navy for a shipboard fighter suitable for operation from the catapults of its Battleships and Cruisers. The Bernard design, the H.52, was a mid-winged monoplane based on its Bernard 260 landplane fighter, using the same wings, rear fuselage and tail surfaces as the earlier design. It was of all-metal construction, principally duralumin, with a monocoque fuselage and stressed skin cantilever wings that were integrally constructed with the centre fuselage.  Leading edge slots and large flaps were fitted to the wing to lower its landing speed, while its undercarriage consisted of two main floats. A single supercharged Gnome-Rhône 9Kdrs radial engine powered the aircraft

The first of two prototypes flew on 16 June 1933, with the second flying in 1934. No production followed, with Bernard choosing to develop a new fighter to meet the requirements of the French Navy, the Bernard H.110. This had a similar layout, with wooden wings and a more powerful engine fitted, but had no more success in attracting orders than the H.52, the French Navy eventually selecting the Loire 210.

Specifications

See also

Notes

Bibliography
 Green, William and Gordon Swanborough. The Complete Book of Fighters. New York, Smithmark, 1994. .

 "New Aircraft:The Bernard 52 C I". Flight, 22 March 1934. p. 286.
 "The Fourteenth Paris Airshow". Flight, 22 November 1934, pp. 1236–1250.

External links

Aviafrance

1930s French fighter aircraft
Floatplanes
H052
Single-engined tractor aircraft
Aircraft first flown in 1933